Oded Liphshitz (in Hebrew: (עודד ליפשיץ) is an Israeli playwright.

He was born in Kiryat Ata, Israel, in 1981, and currently lives in Tel Aviv and teaches in the theatre department of Tel Aviv University. 

His play Albert received the Bernstein prize for literature 2012. His play The Light Turns Up On Me has won Beit lessin's Open stage 1st Award 2010 along with Heidelberg's stage market 2010 special award. Liphshitz' plays have been produced in Israel and abroad.

He was marked on several occasions by critics and scholars as one of the prominent voices of Israeli young generation of playwrights.

Plays produced
(W: Wrote, D: Directed, M: Music)
 Jona's Story		Iyun Theatre Ensemble.			Tel Aviv		2013	(W/D/M) 
 The light turns up on me "Heidelberger Stückemarkt"		Heidelberg 2010 (W)
	"Bet-lessin, Stage market"	Tel Aviv  2010 
 "New writing from Israel" Festival	London		2012
 "Lifgosh: To meet" Festival		London		2013 
 Kigler: His life and death      Acco Festival, Herzlia ensemble, IL 2012 (W/D)
 Perpetuum Mobile	Tau Theatre				Tel Aviv 2011	(W/D) (Written with the ensemble)
 Creditors		Tel Aviv University			Tel Aviv		2009	(W/D) (AN adaptation to Strindberg's Creditors)
 Sonia and Bobek	5th International Play Festival 		Ohio		2007	(W)
			Tmunah Theatre (home production)	Tel Aviv		2008	
 A Chair			Arab Hebrew Theatre			Tel Aviv		2008	(W/D/M)
 Tzozi			7th Annual Small Bama Festival		Tel Aviv		2008	(W/D/M)
			Tmunah Theatre			Tel Aviv		2009
 The Girl Who Is Actually a Wheelbarrow		Tel Aviv University			Tel Aviv		2009	(W)
 Yam Yabasha		"Iyun" Theatre Ensemble 			around Israel	2009 	(W/D/M)
 A Requiem to Daniel	Act II Festival				Haifa		2009	(W/D/M)	
 Now In Front Of the Wall Tzavta festival for Israeli Drama 	Tel Aviv		2008	(W)

Prizes

 2013	"Israeli drama developing fund" - Writing Grant for "I came into the world"
 2012	"Bernstein Prize for literature" for the play "Albert"
 2010	Best Play Award for "The light turns up on me" -			Beit-lessin Open-stage festival.
 2010	Best Play collective award for "The light turns upon me"	-	Heidelberg Stukemarkt
 2010	Citation Award for "we can do something about it" -		Tsavta "Tsav kri'a" Fest'.
 2010	Citation Award for writing and directing "Yam Yabasha" - 		"Sal Tarbut" by the IL          Culture Dept'.
 2008	1st place: best play, best production, best performance for "Tzotzi" -	"Small Stage" Fest. 
 2007 	1st place in playwrighting contest "Sonia and bobek" -		Tel Aviv University

External links
 Oded Liphshitz' site
 Oded Liphshitz plays

References

Living people
Israeli Jews
Israeli male dramatists and playwrights
Jewish dramatists and playwrights
Academic staff of Tel Aviv University
Year of birth missing (living people)